Sigurd Grønli (born 17 October 2000) is a Norwegian professional footballer who plays as a striker for Bryne.

Career statistics
.

References

2000 births
Living people
Sportspeople from Tromsø
Norwegian footballers
Tromsø IL players
Eliteserien players
Grorud IL players
Norwegian First Division players
Association football forwards
Tromsdalen UIL players